Jay-Roy Jornell Grot (born 13 March 1998) is a Dutch professional footballer who plays as a striker or right winger for J1 League club Kashiwa Reysol. He also played for Netherlands U21s.

Career

NEC
Grot played in Vitesse 1892's youth and then ESA Rijkerswoerd and at ten he was scouted by NEC and joined their academy. After 7 years in the academy Grot joined the NEC first team during the winter period of the 2014–15 season. In the summer of 2015, Grot signed a 3-year professional deal at the club.

He made his Eredivisie debut for NEC on 12 August 2015 in a 1–0 victory against Excelsior. On 26 November 2016, Grot scored his first goals for NEC, scoring a brace in the home 3–2 victory against FC Twente.

Despite scoring six goals for NEC in 24 appearances during the 2016–17 season, NEC suffered relegation from the Eredivisie, including scoring against FC Emmen in the first relegation playoff before losing to NAC Breda.

In June 2017, Grot flew in to Florence for talks with Serie A side Fiorentina, however the move fell through when the clubs couldn't agree on a fee.

On 22 August 2017, it was announced that Grot was flying to Leeds for a medical and to discuss personal terms with Leeds United, after a bid had been accepted.

Leeds United
On 24 August 2017, Grot signed a four-year deal with EFL Championship side Leeds United for an undisclosed fee. He was assigned the number 11 shirt. On 26 August, Grot made his debut for Leeds in a 2–0 victory against Nottingham Forest. On 19 September, Grot made his first start for the club in a League Cup tie against Premier League side Burnley in Leeds' penalty shootout victory following a 2–2 draw. On 17 December 2017, Grot was jeered by Leeds fans after coming on as a substitute in a 1–0 win against Norwich City, with the then head coach Thomas Christiansen defending the player who had still not scored for the club.

He scored his first goal for the club in a defeat against Sheffield Wednesday on 17 March 2018. On 10 April 2018, Grot made his first league start in the EFL Championship game against Preston North End (with all his league appearances prior coming as a substitute).

After the end of the season, Grot was widely praised after he carried out an honest and open interview with Voetbal International in July 2018 talking about his 'difficult' first season in English football and living away from home.

VVV-Venlo (loan)
On 3 July 2018, Grot joined Eredivisie side VVV-Venlo on loan until 31 May 2019, in order to gain first team experience.

He made his debut for Venlo on 11 August 2018, in a 1–0 win against Willem II. His first goal for the club came on 22 September 2018 in a 3–0 win against NAC Breda. He followed this up with a goal against ADO Den Haag in a 2–0 win on 21 October 2018. His performances in the first half of the season at VVV-Venlo, helped earn him a call up to the Netherlands U21's.

In total, he made 33 appearances, playing in the majority of the 33 games as a left winger and scoring 6 goals and 3 assists for VVV-Venlo in Eredivisie, with Grot praised for his performances especially after scoring 3 goals in the final 5 games of the season.

Vitesse (loan)
On 28 June 2019, Grot joined to Vitesse on loan until 30 June 2020. He made his debut on 3 August 2019, in the 2-2 draw against Ajax, before Grot scored his first goal for the club in his 2nd game in a 0-2 win against Willem II on 10 August.

VfL Osnabrück
On 1 February 2021, the last day of the 2020–21 winter transfer window, Grot signed with 2. Bundesliga side VfL Osnabrück having agreed a contract until summer 2022.

Viborg
After leaving Osnabrück, Grot signed a two-year contract with newly promoted Danish Superliga club Viborg FF on 6 July 2021. He made his debut for the club on 22 August, coming off the bench in the 79th minute for Tobias Bech in a 2–0 league win over AGF. His first goal came on 2 September in a Danish Cup game against Fredericia, scoring the 1–1 equaliser shortly before full time. Despite his goal, Viborg were knocked out of the tournament after a penalty shootout. Grot made his first league start a few days later, playing 77 minutes of a 3–2 loss to AaB as a left winger. He would remain a starter throughout the autumn, as Viborg performed above expectations and had stayed out of the relegation zone. On 4 March 2022, Grot scored his first league goal for the club in a 3–1 loss to Midtjylland, heading in a cross from Younes Bakiz.

He made his European debut on 21 July 2022, starting in the UEFA Europa Conference League qualifier against Sūduva which ended in a 1–0 away win at Marijampolė Football Arena. Grot got off the mark on 14 August when he scored in a 2–0 league win over Silkeborg. His goalscoring picked up later in the fall, scoring six goals over seven matches in October and November 2022, bringing his tally to nine goals in seventeen total league appearances. Grot's performances led to him being named Superliga Player of the Month for October.

Kashiwa Reysol
On 2 February 2023, Grot was sold to Japanese J1 League club Kashiwa Reysol.

International career
Grot is eligible for Netherlands and Suriname. He has represented both Netherlands U19 and Netherlands U17's at international level.

He was included in Netherlands U17's squad for the European Championships in 2015 and Netherlands U19 European Championship squad during the summer of 2017, with Grot scoring against Germany U19's in their group match on 3 July in a 4–1 victory, helping the Netherlands U19's reach the semi finals of the tournament.

He made his debut for Netherlands U21 in November 2018, playing against Germany U21

Style of play
Grot has been described as a powerful, athletic and physical striker, who is renowned for his pace, power and dribbling ability. Whilst mainly a central striker, he can also play as a right winger.

Personal life
His cousins Guilliano and Sherwin Grot are both professional footballers.

Career statistics

Honours
Individual
 Superliga Player of the Month: October 2022

References

External links
 

1998 births
Living people
Footballers from Arnhem
Association football forwards
Dutch footballers
Dutch expatriate footballers
Netherlands under-21 international footballers
Netherlands youth international footballers
Dutch sportspeople of Surinamese descent
NEC Nijmegen players
Leeds United F.C. players
VVV-Venlo players
SBV Vitesse players
VfL Osnabrück players
Viborg FF players
Kashiwa Reysol players
Eredivisie players
Eerste Divisie players
English Football League players
Dutch expatriate sportspeople in England
Dutch expatriate sportspeople in Germany
Dutch expatriate sportspeople in Denmark
Dutch expatriate sportspeople in Japan
Expatriate footballers in England
Expatriate footballers in Germany
Expatriate men's footballers in Denmark
Expatriate footballers in Japan